Boyd Mill Ruins is a property in Franklin, Tennessee that was listed on the National Register of Historic Places in 1988.

The mill was built in the early 19th century, powered by the West Harpeth River. The mill was used to produce flour and corn mill for area farmers for more than 50 years.  It was one of about a dozen water-powered mills in the county in the 19th century.  Around 1900, the mill ceased operation, and was left to fall into ruins. The stone foundations and turbine pit are more intact than any other former mill buildings in the county, providing the best example of the importance of the milling industry within 19th century commerce.

The W.A. Boyd farm was one of the larger farms/plantations in Williamson County before and after the American Civil War.  After the war, many of these were reduced in size, but the Boyd farm, which included the Boyd Mill had 528 acres.

The 157 acre Boyd-Wilson Farm, a century farm that is now also NRHP-listed, includes the Boyd Mill Ruins.

See also
William Boyd House

References

External links
Boyd Mill Ruins, photo at pbase

Grinding mills on the National Register of Historic Places in Tennessee
Buildings and structures in Williamson County, Tennessee
Ruins in the United States
Grinding mills in Tennessee
National Register of Historic Places in Williamson County, Tennessee